John Edgar Harrison (17 October 1915 – 16 March 1989) was an Australian rules footballer who played with Melbourne and North Melbourne in the Victorian Football League (VFL).

Notes

External links 

Jack Harrison's playing statistics from The VFA Project

1915 births
1989 deaths
Australian rules footballers from Melbourne
Melbourne Football Club players
Oakleigh Football Club players
North Melbourne Football Club players
People from Glen Huntly, Victoria